House of Pain is an American hip-hop group.

House of Pain may also refer to:

Fiction
 House of Pain, a fictional laboratory in H.G. Wells' 1896 novel The Island of Doctor Moreau
 "House of Pain" (The Grim Adventures of Billy & Mandy), a television episode

Music
 House of Pain (album), a 1992 album by House of Pain
 "House of Pain" (Faster Pussycat song), 1989
 "House of Pain", a song by Deep Purple from Bananas
 "House of Pain", a song by The Game from LAX
 "House of Pain", a song by Van Halen from 1984
 "House of Pain", a song by Venom from Metal Black
 "House of Pain", a song by Paul Wall and Chamillionaire from Controversy Sells

Sports venues with the nickname
 Carisbrook, an outdoor stadium in Dunedin, New Zealand
 Sardis Road, a rugby union stadium in Pontypridd, Wales
 Subiaco Oval, an outdoor stadium Perth, Western Australia
 Astrodome, A Defunct domed stadium home to the NFL’s Houston Oilers during the 1980s and early 1990s.

See also
Tyler Perry's House of Payne, an American sitcom